Sohran (also Romanized as Sohrān and Sahran) is a village in Gamasiyab Rural District, in the Central District of Nahavand County, Hamadan Province, Iran. At the 2006 census, its population was 852, in 213 families.

References 

Populated places in Nahavand County